Kinsarvik is a former municipality in the old Hordaland county, Norway. The administrative centre of the municipality was the village of Kinsarvik where Kinsarvik Church is located. The municipality of Kinsarvik existed two different times: from 1838 until 1869 and then again from 1913 until 1964. The municipality centered on the inner part of the Hardangerfjorden, and (originally) surrounded all of the Sørfjorden. The original Kinsarvik encompassed all of the present day municipalities of Ullensvang (except for Røldal) and a small part of Voss.

History
The large parish of Kinsarvik (spelled Kinzervig at that time) was established as a municipality on 1 January 1838 (see formannskapsdistrikt law). The parish of Kinsarvik was centered at Kinsarvik Church and it had one parish annex: Ullensvang. In 1869, Ullensvang became the main parish, and Kinsarvik became an annex to Ullensvang (and the municipality then changed its name to Ullensvang).

On 1 July 1913, the municipality of Ullensvang was split into three separate municipalities.  The northwestern part became Kinsarvik (population: 1,736), the central part was Ullensvang (population: 1,941) and the southern part became Odda (population: 3,077). During the 1960s, there were many municipal mergers across Norway due to the work of the Schei Committee. On 1 January 1964, Kinsarvik municipality was dissolved.  The Lussand-Kvanndal area north of the Hardangerfjorden (population: 72) was transferred to Granvin Municipality. The remainder of Kinsarvik (population: 1,513) was merged into Ullensvang Municipality once again.

Municipal council
The municipal council  of Kinsarvik is made up of 13 representatives that were elected to four year terms.  The party breakdown of the final municipal council was as follows:

See also
List of former municipalities of Norway

References

Ullensvang
Former municipalities of Norway
1838 establishments in Norway
1860s disestablishments in Norway
1913 establishments in Norway
1964 disestablishments in Norway